This is a list of chess openings that are gambits.
The gambits are organized into sections by the parent chess opening, giving the gambit name, ECO code, and defining moves in algebraic chess notation.

Alekhine's Defence
 Alekhine Gambit – B02 – 1.e4 Nf6 2.e5 Nd5 3.c4 Nb6 4.d4 d6 5.Nf3 Bg4 6.Be2 dxe5 7.Nxe5
 John Tracy Gambit – B02 – 1.e4 Nf6 2.Nf3
 Krejcik Gambit – B02 – 1.e4 Nf6 2.Bc4 Nxe4 3.Bxf7+
 Spielmann Gambit – B02 – 1.e4 Nf6 2.Nc3 d5 3.e5 Nfd7 4.e6
 O'Sullivan Gambit – B03 – 1.e4 Nf6 2.e5 Nd5 3.d4 b5

Amar Opening
 Paris Gambit – A00 – 1.Nh3 d5 2.g3 e5 3.f4 Bxh3 4.Bxh3 exf4 5.0-0
Gent Gambit – A00 – 1.Nh3 d5 2.g3 e5 3.f4 Bxh3 4.Bxh3 exf4 5.0-0 fxg3 6.hxg3

Benko Opening
 Dada Gambit – A00 – 1.g3 e5 2.Bg2 d5 3.b4
 Nescafe Frappe Attack – A57 – 1.d4 Nf6 2.c4 c5 3.d5 b5 4.cxb5 a6 5.Nc3 axb5 6.e4 b4 7.Nb5 d6

Bird's Opening
 From's Gambit – A02 – 1.f4 e5
 From's Gambit, Bahr Gambit  –  A02 – 1.f4 e5 2.Nc3
 From's Gambit, Lipke Variation – A02 – 1.f4 e5 2.fxe5 d6 3.exd6 Bxd6 4.Nf3 Nh6 5.d4
 From's Gambit, Lasker Gambit – A02 – 1.f4 e5 2.fxe5 f6
 From's Gambit, Platz Gambit – A02 – 1.f4 e5 2.fxe5 Ne7
 From's Gambit, Schlechter Gambit – A02 – 1.f4 e5 2.fxe5 Nc6
 From's Gambit, Langheld Gambit – A02 – 1.f4 e5 2.fxe5 d6 3.exd6 Nf6
 From's Gambit, Siegener Gambit – A02 –1.f4 e5 2.d4 exd4 3.Nf3 c5 4.c3
 King’s Bishop’s Gambit – A02 — 1.f4 f5 2.g4
 Swiss Gambit – A02 – 1.f4 f5 2.e4 fxe4 3.Nc3 Nf6 4.g4
 Hobbs Gambit – A02 – 1. f4 g5
 Hobbs-Zilbermints Gambit – A02 – 1.f4 h6 2.Nf3 g5
 Inverted Dutch, Dudweiler Gambit – A02 – 1.f4 d5 2.g4
 Inverted Dutch, Batavo Gambit – A02 – 1.f4 d5 2.Nf3 c5 3.e4 dxe4
 Inverted Dutch, Thomas Gambit – A02 – 1.f4 d5 2.b3 Nf6 3.Bb2 d4 4.Nf3 c5 5.e3
 Inverted Dutch, Williams, Zilbermints Variation – A02 – 1.f4 d5 2.e4 dxe4 3.Nc3 Nf6 4.Nge2
 Sturm Gambit – A03 – 1.f4 d5 2.c4
 Swiss Gambit, Wagner-Zwitersch Gambit – A03 – 1.f4 f5 2.e4 fxe4 3.Nc3 Nf6 4.g4
 Williams Gambit – A03 – 1.f4 d5 2.e4

Bishop's Opening
 Calabrian Countergambit – C23 – 1.e4 e5 2.Bc4 f5
 Four Pawns Gambit – C23 – 1.e4 e5 2.Bc4 Bc5 3.b4 Bxb4 4.f4 exf4 5.Nf3 Be7 6.d4 Bh4+ 7.g3 fxg3 8.0-0 gxh2+ 9.Kh1
 Khan Gambit – C23 – 1.e4 e5 2.Bc4 d5
 Lewis Countergambit – C23 – 1.e4 e5 2.Bc4 Bc5 3.c3 d5
 Lewis Gambit – C23 – 1.e4 e5 2.Bc4 Bc5 3.d4
 Lopez Gambit – C23 – 1.e4 e5 2.Bc4 Bc5 3.Qe2 Nf6 4.d3 Nc6 5.c3 Ne7 6.f4
 McDonnell Double Gambit – C23 – 1.e4 e5 2.Bc4 Bc5 3.b4 Bxb4 4.f4
 Petroff Gambit – C23 – 1.e4 e5 2.Bc4 Bc5 3.Nf3 d6 4.c3 Qe7 5.d4
 Wing Gambit – C23 – 1.e4 e5 2.Bc4 Bc5 3.b4
 Boden–Kieseritzky Gambit – C24 – 1.e4 e5 2.Bc4 Nf6 3.Nf3 Nxe4 4.Nc3
 Greco Gambit – C24 – 1.e4 e5 2.Bc4 Nf6 3.f4
 Ponziani Gambit – C24 – 1.e4 e5 2.Bc4 Nf6 3.d4
 Urusov (Ponziani) Gambit – C24 – 1.e4 e5 2.Bc4 Nf6 3.d4 exd4 4.Nf3

Blackmar–Diemer Gambit
 Blackmar Gambit – D00 – 1.d4 d5 2.e4 dxe4 3.f3
 Blackmar–Diemer Gambit – D00 – 1.d4 d5 2.e4 dxe4 3.Nc3 Nf6 4.f3 – also 1.d4 d5 2.Nc3 Nf6 3.e4 dxe4 4.f3
 Ryder Gambit – D00 – 1.d4 d5 2.e4 dxe4 3.Nc3 Nf6 4.f3 exf3 5.Qxf3
 Hubsch Gambit – D00 – 1.d4 d5 2.Nc3 Nf6 3.e4 Nxe4 4.Nxe4 dxe4 4.Bc4
 Zilbermints Gambit – D00 – 1.d4 d5 2.e4 dxe4 3.Nc3 Nf6 4.f3 exf3 5.Nxf3 e6 6.Bg5 Be7 7.Bd3 Nc6 8.0-0 Nxd4 9.Kh1

Budapest Gambit
 Budapest Gambit – A51 – 1.d4 Nf6 2.c4 e5
 Fajarowicz Gambit – A51 – 1.d4 Nf6 2.c4 e5 3.dxe5 Ne4
 Balogh Gambit – A52 – 1.d4 Nf6 2.c4 e5 3.dxe5 Ng4 4.e4 d6

Caro–Kann Defence
 Schaeffer Gambit – B10 –  1.e4 c6 2.Bc4 d5 3.Bb3
 Van Weersel Attack – B10 – 1.e4 c6 2.c4 d5 3.cxd5 cxd5 4.Qb3
 Maróczy Gambit – B12 – 1.e4 c6 2.d4 d5 3. f3 dxe4 4.fxe4 e5 5.Nf3 exd4 6.Bc4
 Tal Variation 5.Bg5 – B12 – 1. e4 c6 2. d4 d5 3. e5 Bf5 4. h4 h5 5. Bg5 Qb6 6. Bd3 Bxd3 7. Qxd3 Qxb2 8. e6
 Godley Gambit – B13 – 1.e4 c6 2.d4 d5 3.exd5 Nf6
 Alekhine Gambit – B15 – 1.e4 c6 2.d4 d5 3.Nc3 dxe4 4.Nxe4 Nf6 5.Bd3
 Rasa–Studier Gambit – B15 – 1.e4 c6 2.d4 d5 3.Nc3 dxe4 4.f3

Center Game 
 Beyer Gambit – C21 – 1.e4 e5 2.d4 d5

Danish Gambit
 Danish Gambit – C21 – 1.e4 e5 2.d4 exd4 3.c3
 Halasz Gambit – C21 – 1.e4 e5 2.d4 exd4 3.f4

Dutch Defence
 Janzen-Korchnoi Gambit – A80 – 1.d4 f5 2.h3 Nf6 3.g4
 Kingfisher Gambit – A80 – 1.d4 f5 2.Nc3 d5 3.e4
 Krejcik Gambit – A80 – 1.d4 f5 2.g4
 Manhattan Gambit – A80 – 1.d4 f5 2.Qd3 e6 (or 2...g6, d5, d6) 3.g4
 Spielmann Gambit – A80 – 1.d4 f5 2.Nc3 Nf6 3.g4
 Staunton Gambit – A82 – 1.d4 f5 2.e4
 Lasker Gambit – A83 – 1.d4 f5 2.e4 fxe4 3.Nc3 Nf6 4.Bg5 c6 (or 4...g6) 5.f3
Staunton Gambit Deferred – A84 – 1.d4 f5 2.c4 e6 3.e4

English Opening
 Ferenc Gambit – A10 – 1.c4 f5 2.Nc3 Nf6 3.e4
 Jaenisch Gambit (Halibut Gambit) – A10 – 1.c4 b5
 White Gambit – A10 – 1.c4 d5 2.b3 dxc4 3.bxc4 Qd4 4.Nc3
 Bellon Gambit – A22 – 1.c4 e5 2.Nc3 Nf6 3.Nf3 e4 4.Ng5 b5
 Symmetrical, Queen’s Bishop’s Gambit – A30 – 1.c4 c5 2.b4
 Wade Gambit – A10 – 1.c4 f5 2.g4

Englund Gambit
 Charlick Gambit – A40 – 1.d4 e5
 Englund Gambit – A40 – 1.d4 e5 2.dxe5 Nc6 3.Nf3 Qe7 4.Qd5 f6 5.exf6 Nxf6
 Mosquito Gambit – A40 – 1.d4 e5 2.dxe5 Qh4
 Soller Gambit – A40 – 1.d4 e5 2.dxe5 Nc6 3.Nf3 f6
 Zilbermints Gambit – A40 – 1.d4 e5 dxe5 Nc6 3.Nf3 Nge7

Evans Gambit 
 Evans Countergambit – C51 – 1.e4 e5 2.Nf3 Nc6 3.Bc4 Bc5 4.b4 d5
 Evans Gambit – C51 – 1.e4 e5 2.Nf3 Nc6 3.Bc4 Bc5 4.b4

Four Knights Game
 Belgrade Gambit – C47 – 1.e4 e5 2.Nf3 Nc6 3.Nc3 Nf6 4.d4 exd4 5.Nd5
 Halloween Gambit (Müller–Schultze) Gambit – C47 – 1.e4 e5 2.Nf3 Nc6 3.Nc3 Nf6 4.Nxe5

French Defence
 Alapin Gambit – C00 – 1.e4 e6 2.d4 d5 3.Be3
 Orthoschnapp Gambit – C00 – 1.e4 e6 2.c4 d5 3.cxd5 exd5 4.Qb3
 Diemer–Duhm Gambit – C00 – 1.e4 e6 2.d4 d5 3.c4
 French: Wing Gambit – C00 – 1.e4 e6 2.Nf3 d5 3.e5 c5 4.b4
 Franco-Hiva Gambit – C00 – 1.e4 e6 2.Nf3 f5
 Krol Gambit - C00 -  1.e4 e6 2.f4 d5 3.Nf3
 Papa-Ticulat Gambit - C00 - 1.e4 e6 2.b3 d5 3.Bb2
 Banzai-Leong Gambit - C00 - 1.e4 e6 2.b4
 Perseus Gambit - C00 - 1.e4 e6 2.d4 d5 3.Nf3
 Baeuerle Gambit - C01 - 1.e4 e6 2.d4 b5
 Milner-Barry Gambit – C02 – 1.e4 e6 2.d4 d5 3.e5 c5 4.c3 Nc6 5.Nf3 Qb6 6.Bd3 cxd4 7.cxd4 Bd7 8.Nc3 Nxd4 9.Nxd4 Qxd4
 Nimzowitsch Gambit – C02 – 1.e4 e6 2.d4 d5 3.e5 c5 4.Qg4
 Albin-Chatard Gambit - C13 - 1.e4 e6 2.d4 d5 3.Nc3 Nf6 4.Bg5 Be7 5.e5 Nfd7 6.h4 Bxg5 7.hxg5 Qxg5
 Winawer, Alekhine (Maroczy) Gambit – C15 – 1.e4 e6 2.d4 d5 3.Nc3 Bb4 4.Ne2
 Winawer, Alekhine Gambit – C15 – 1.e4 e6 2.d4 d5 3.Nc3 Bb4 4.Ne2 dxe4 5.a3 Bxc3+
 Winawer, Alekhine Gambit, Kan Variation – C15 – 1.e4 e6 2.d4 d5 3.Nc3 Bb4 4.Ne2 dxe4 5.a3 Bxc3+ 6.Nxc3 Nc6
 Winawer, Alekhine Gambit, Alatortsev Variation – C15 – 1.e4 e6 2.d4 d5 3.Nc3 Bb4 4.Ne2 dxe4 5.a3 Be7 6.Nxe4 Nf6 7.N2g3 0-0 8.Be2 Nc6
 Fingerslip Variation – C15 – 1.e4 e6 2.d4 d5 3.Nc3 Bb4 4.Bd2

Giuoco Piano
 Deutz Gambit  – C50 – 1.e4 e5 2.Nf3 Nc6 3.Bc4 Bc5 4.0-0 Nf6 5.d4
 Italian Gambit – C50 – 1.e4 e5 2.Nf3 Nc6 3.Bc4 Bc5 4.d4
 Jerome Gambit – C50 – 1.e4 e5 2.Nf3 Nc6 3.Bc4 Bc5 4.Bxf7+ Kxf7
 Albin Gambit –  C54 – 1.e4 e5 2.Nf3 Nc6 3.Bc4 Bc5 4.c3 Nf6 5.0-0
 Moeller Gambit – C54 – 1.e4 e5 2.Nf3 Nc6 3.Bc4 Bc5 4.c3 Nf6 5.d4 exd4 6.cxd4 Bb4+ 7.Nc3 Nxe4 8.0-0 Bxc3 9.d5

Indian Defence
 Benko Gambit (Volga Gambit) – A57 – 1.d4 Nf6 2.c4 c5 3.d5 b5
 Grünfeld Gambit – D83 – 1.d4 Nf6 2.c4 g6 3.Nc3 d5 4.Bf4 Bg7 5.e3 0-0
 Blumenfeld Counter Gambit – E10 – 1.d4 Nf6 2.c4 e6 3.Nf3 c5 4.d5 b5
 Danube Gambit – E60 – 1.d4 Nf6 2.c4 g6 3.d5 b5

Italian Game
 Blackburne Shilling Gambit – C50 – 1.e4 e5 2.Nf3 Nc6 3.Bc4 Nd4
 Rousseau Gambit – C50 – 1.e4 e5 2.Nf3 Nc6 3.Bc4 f5
 Nakhmanson Gambit – C56 – 1.e4 e5 2.Nf3 Nc6 3.Bc4 Nf6 4.d4 exd4 5.0-0 Nxe4 6.Nc3
 Lucchini Gambit – C50 – 1.e4 e5 2.Nf3 Nc6 3.Bc4 Bc5 4.d3 f5

King's Gambit
 King's Gambit – C30 – 1.e4 e5 2.f4

King's Gambit Accepted
 Allgaier Gambit – C39 – 1.e4 e5 2.f4 exf4 3.Nf3 g5 4.h4 g4 5.Ng5
 Australian Gambit – C37 – 1.e4 e5 2.f4 exf4 3.Nf3 g5 4.Bc4 g4 5.h4
 Bertin (Three Pawns) Gambit – C35 – 1.e4 e5 2.f4 exf4 3.Nf3 Be7 4.Bc4 Bh4+ 5.g3 fxg3 6.0-0 gxh2+ 7.Kh1
 Bishop's Gambit – C33 – 1.e4 e5 2.f4 exf4 3.Bc4
 Blackburne Gambit – C39 – 1.e4 e5 2.f4 exf4 3.Nf3 g5 4.h4 g4 5.Ng5 h6 6.Nxf7 Kxf7 7.Nc3
 Breyer Gambit – C33 – 1.e4 e5 2.f4 exf4 3.Qf3
 Bryan (Kieseritzky) Countergambit – C33 – 1.e4 e5 2.f4 exf4 3.Bc4 b5
 Bryan Countergambit – C33 – 1.e4 e5 2.f4 exf4 3.Bc4 Qh4+ 4.Kf1 b5
 Carrera (Basman) Gambit – C33 – 1.e4 e5 2.f4 exf4 3.Qe2
 Cunningham Gambit – C35 – 1.e4 e5 2.f4 exf4 3.Nf3 Be7
 Double Muzio Gambit – C37 – 1.e4 e5 2.f4 exf4 3.Nf3 g5 4.Bc4 g4 5.0-0 gxf3 6.Qxf3 Qf6 7.e5 Qxe5 8.Bxf7+
 Gama Gambit – C33 – 1.e4 e5 2.f4 exf4 3.g3
 Ghulam Khassim Gambit – C37 – 1.e4 e5 2.f4 exf4 3.Nf3 g5 4.Bc4 g4 5.d4
 Gianutio Countergambit – C34 – 1.e4 e5 2.f4 exf4 3.Nf3 f5
 Hanstein Gambit – C38 – 1.e4 e5 2.f4 exf4 3.Nf3 g5 4.Bc4 Bg7 5.0-0
 Keres Gambit – C33 – 1.e4 e5 2.f4 exf4 3.Nc3
 Kieseritzky Gambit – C39 – 1.e4 e5 2.f4 exf4 3.Nf3 g5 4.h4 g4 5.Ne5
 Lopez–Gianutio Countergambit – C33 – 1.e4 e5 2.f4 exf4 3.Bc4 f5
 McDonnell Gambit – C37 – 1.e4 e5 2.f4 exf4 3.Nf3 g5 4.Bc4 g4 5.Nc3
 Muzio Gambit – C37 – 1.e4 e5 2.f4 exf4 3.Nf3 g5 4.Bc4 g4 5.0-0
 Orsini Gambit – C33 – 1.e4 e5 2.f4 exf4 3.b3
 Paris Gambit – C33 – 1.e4 e5 2.f4 exf4 3.Ne2
 Philidor Gambit – C38 – 1.e4 e5 2.f4 exf4 3.Nf3 g5 4.Bc4 Bg7 5.h4
 Polerio Gambit – C37 – 1.e4 e5 2.f4 exf4 3.Nf3 g5 4.Bc4
 Quade Gambit – C37 – 1.e4 e5 2.f4 exf4 3.Nf3 g5 4.Nc3
 Rice Gambit – C39 – 1.e4 e5 2.f4 exf4 3.Nf3 g5 4.h4 g4 5.Ne5 Nf6 6.Bc4 d5 7.exd5 Bd6 8.0-0
 Rosentreter Gambit – C37 – 1.e4 e5 2.f4 exf4 3.Nf3 g5 4.d4 g4
 Salvio Gambit – C37 – 1.e4 e5 2.f4 exf4 3.Nf3 g5 4.Bc4 g4 5.Ne5
 Schurig Gambit – C33 – 1.e4 e5 2.f4 exf4 3.Bb5 (or 3.Bd3)
 Sorensen Gambit – C37 – 1.e4 e5 2.f4 exf4 3.Nf3 g5 4.d4 g4 5.Ne5
 Stamma Gambit – C33 – 1.e4 e5 2.f4 exf4 3.h4
 Tartakower (Lesser Bishop's) Gambit – C33 – 1.e4 e5 2.f4 exf4 3.Be2
 Triple Muzio Gambit – C37 – 1.e4 e5 2.f4 exf4 3.Nf3 g5 4.Bc4 g4 5.0-0 gxf3 6.Qxf3 Qf6 7.e5 Qxe5 8.Bxf7+ Kxf7 9.d4 Qxd4+ 10.Be3
 Tumbleweed Gambit – C33 – 1.e4 e5 2.f4 exf4 3.Kf2
 Villemson Gambit – C33 – 1.e4 e5 2.f4 exf4 3.d4
 Wild Muzio Gambit – C37 – 1.e4 e5 2.f4 exf4 3.Nf3 g5 4.Bc4 g4 5.Bxf7+

King's Gambit Declined
 Adelaide Countergambit – C30 – 1.e4 e5 2.f4 Nc6 3.Nf3 f5
 Charousek Gambit – C32 – 1.e4 e5 2.f4 d5 3.exd5 e4 4.d3 Nf6 5.dxe4 Nxe4 6.Qe2
 Falkbeer Countergambit – C31 – 1.e4 e5 2.f4 d5
 Miles Gambit – C31 – 1.e4 e5 2.f4 d5 3.exd5 Bc5
 Rubinstein Countergambit – C30 – 1.e4 e5 2.f4 Bc5 3.Nf3 d6 4.c3 f5
 Senechaud Countergambit – C30 – 1.e4 e5 2.f4 Bc5 3.Nf3 g5
 Zilbermints Double Countergambit – C31 – 1.e4 e5 2.f4 g5

King's Pawn Opening
 Duras Gambit (Fred Defence) – B00 – 1.e4 f5 2.exf5 Kf7
 Chicago Gambit – C44 – 1.e4 e5 2.Nf3 Nc6 3.Nxe5 Nxe5 4.d4
 Elephant Gambit – C40 – 1.e4 e5 2.Nf3 d5

Latvian Gambit
 Latvian Gambit (Greco Countergambit) – C40 – 1.e4 e5 2.Nf3 f5
 Latvian Gambit (Lobster Gambit) – C40 – 1.e4 e5 2.Nf3 f5 3.g4
 Svendenborg's Variation – C40 – 1.e4 e5 2.Nf3 f5 3.Nxe5 Nf6 4.Bc4 fxe4 5.Nf7 Qe7 6.Nxh8 d5
 Mayet, Strautins Gambit – C40 – 1.e4 e5 2.Nf3 f5 3. Bc4 b5

Nimzowitsch Defence
 Colorado Gambit (Countergambit) – B00 – 1.e4 Nc6 2.Nf3 f5
 Colorado Countercounter Gambit – B00 — 1.e4 Nc6 2.Nf3 f5 3.e5 d6 4.d4 dxe5 5.d5
 De Smet Gambit – B00 – 1.e4 Nc6 2.d4 e5 3.dxe5 d6
 Heinola-Deppe Gambit – B00 – 1.e4 Nc6 2.d4 d5 3.Nc3 e5

Old Benoni
 Old Benoni (Benoni Gambit) – A43 – 1.d4 c5
 Zilbermints-Benoni Gambit – A43 – 1.d4 c5 2.b4 {also 1.d4 c5 2.Nf3 cxd4 3.b4}

Owen's Defence
 Hekili-Loa Gambit – B00 – 1.e4 b6 2.d4 c5 3.dxc5 Nc6
 Matovinsky Gambit – B00 – 1.e4 b6 2.d4 Bb7 3.Bd3 f5
 Smith Gambit – B00 – 1.e4 b6 2.d4 Bb7 3.Nf3 
 Wind Gambit – B00 – 1.e4 b6 2.d4 Bb7 3.f3 e5

Petrov's Defence
 Boden–Kieseritzky Gambit – C42 – 1.e4 e5 2.Nf3 Nf6 3.Bc4 Nxe4 4.Nc3 Nxc3 5.dxc3 f6
 Cochrane Gambit – C42 – 1.e4 e5 2.Nf3 Nf6 3.Nxe5 d6 4.Nxf7
 Stafford Gambit – C42 – 1.e4 e5 2.Nf3 Nf6 3.Nxe5 Nc6
 Urusov Gambit – C43 – 1.e4 e5 2.Nf3 Nf6 3.d4 exd4 4.Bc4
 Kholmov Gambit – C42 – 1.e4 e5 2.Nf3 Nf6 3.Nxe5 Nxe4 4.Qe2 Qe7 5.Qxe4 d6

Philidor Defence
 Locock Gambit – C41 – 1.e4 e5 2.Nf3 d6 3.d4 Nf6 4.Ng5 h6 5.Nxf7
 Lopez Countergambit – C41 – 1.e4 e5 2.Nf3 d6 3.Bc4 f5
 Philidor Countergambit – C41 – 1.e4 e5 2.Nf3 d6 3.d4 f5

Ponziani Opening
 Neumann Gambit – C44 – 1.e4 e5 2.Nf3 Nc6 3.c3 Nf6 4.Bc4
 Ponziani Countergambit – C44 – 1.e4 e5 2.Nf3 Nc6 3.c3 f5
 Vukovic Gambit – C44 – 1.e4 e5 2.Nf3 Nc6 3.c3 Nf6 4.d4 Nxe4 5.d5 Bc5

Queen's Gambit
 Queen's Gambit – D06 – 1.d4 d5 2.c4
 Albin Countergambit – D08 – 1.d4 d5 2.c4 e5
 Gusev Countergambit – D06 – 1.d4 d5 2.c4 c5 3.cxd5 Nf6

Queen's Pawn Opening
 Steinitz Countergambit – D00 – 1.d4 d5 2.Bf4 c5

Reti Opening
 Herrstrom Gambit – A04 – 1.Nf3 g5
 Lisitsin Gambit – A04 – 1.Nf3 f5 2.e4
 Lisitsin Gambit Deffered – A04 – 1.Nf3 f5 2.d3 Nf6 3.e4
 Ross Gambit – A04 – 1.Nf3 e5
 Tennison Gambit (aka: Abonyi Gambit or Lemberg Gambit or Zukertort Gambit) – A06 – 1.Nf3 d5 2.e4 {also 1.e4 d5 2.Nf3}
 Blumenfeld Reversed Gambit – A09 – 1.Nf3 d5 2.c4 d4 3.e3 c5 4.b4
 Michel Gambit – A09 – 1.Nf3 d5 2.c4 d4 3.b4 c5
 Reti (Landstrasse) Gambit – A09 – 1.Nf3 d5 2.c4

Ruy Lopez
 Brentano Gambit - C60 - 1.e4 e5 2.Nf3 Nc6 3.Bb5 g5
 Spanish Countergambit - C60 - 1.e4 e5 2.Nf3 Nc6 3.Bb5 d5
Rotary-Albany Gambit - C60 - 1.e4 e5 2.Nf3 Nc6 3.Bb5 b6
Schliemann (Jaenisch) Gambit – C63 – 1.e4 e5 2.Nf3 Nc6 3.Bb5 f5
 Alapin Gambit – C68 – 1.e4 e5 2.Nf3 Nc6 3.Bb5 a6 4.Bxc6 dxc6 5.0-0 Bg4 6.h3 h5
 Harksen Gambit – C80 – 1.e4 e5 2.Nf3 Nc6 3.Bb5 a6 4.Ba4 Nf6 5.0-0 Nxe4 6.d4 b5 7.Bb3 d5 8.c4
 Karpov Gambit – C80 – 1.e4 e5 2.Nf3 Nc6 3.Bb5 a6 4.Ba4 Nf6 5.0-0 Nxe4 6.d4 b5 7.Bb3 d5 8.dxe5 Be6 9.Nbd2 Nc5 10.c3 d4 11.Ng5
 Basque Gambit – C84 – 1.e4 e5 2.Nf3 Nc6 3.Bb5 a6 4.Ba4 Nf6 5.0-0 Be7 6.d4 exd4 7.e5 Ne4 8.c3
 Marshall Gambit – C89 – 1.e4 e5 2.Nf3 Nc6 3.Bb5 a6 4.Ba4 Nf6 5.0-0 Be7 6.Re1 b5 7.Bb3 0-0 8.c3 d5
 Kevitz Gambit – C60 – 1.e4 e5 2.Nf3 Nc6 3.Bb5 g6 4.c3 f5

Scandinavian Defense
 Boehnke Gambit – B01 – 1.e4 d5 2.exd5 e6 3.dxe6 Bxe6
 Kotrč–Mieses Gambit – B01 – 1.e4 d5 2.exd5 Qxd5 3.Nc3 Qa5 4.b4
 Marshall Gambit – B01 – 1.e4 d5 2.exd5 Nf6
 Icelandic Gambit – B01 – 1.e4 d5 2.exd5 Nf6 3.c4 e6
 Portuguese Gambit – B01 – 1.e4 d5 2.exd5 Nf6 3.d4 Bg4
 Kádas Gambit – B01 – 1.e4 d5 2.exd5 Nf6 3.d4 c6 4.dxc6 e5
 Tennison Gambit (aka: Abonyi Gambit or Lemberg Gambit or Zukertort Gambit) – B01 – 1.e4 d5 2.Nf3 {also 1.Nf3 d5 2.e4}

Scotch Game
 Göring Gambit – C44 – 1.e4 e5 2.Nf3 Nc6 3.d4 exd4 4.c3
 Relfsson Gambit – C44 – 1.e4 e5 2.Nf3 Nc6 3.d4 exd4 4.Bb5
 Scotch Gambit – C44 – 1.e4 e5 2.Nf3 Nc6 3.d4 exd4 4.Bc4

Semi-Slav Defense
 Marshall Gambit – D31 – 1.d4 d5 2.c4 e6 3.Nc3 c6 4.e4 dxe4 5.Nxe4 Bb4+ 6.Bd2
 Anti-Meran Gambit – D44 – 1.d4 d5 2.c4 e6 3.Nc3 Nf6 4.Nf3 c6 5.Bg5
 Anti-Moscow Gambit – D44 – 1.d4 d5 2.c4 e6 3.Nc3 Nf6 4.Nf3 c6 5.Bg5 h6 6.Bh4 g5 7.Bg3 dxc4 8.e4

Sicilian Defence
 Wing Gambit Delayed – B20 – 1.e4 c5 2.a3 Nc6 (or 2...e6) 3.b4
 Wing Gambit – B20 – 1.e4 c5 2.b4
 Andreaschek Gambit – B21 – 1.e4 c5 2.d4 cxd4 3.Nf3 e5 4.c3
 Morphy Gambit – B21 – 1.e4 c5 2.d4 cxd4 3.Nf3
 Smith–Morra Gambit – B21 – 1.e4 c5 2.d4 cxd4 3.c3
 Rubinstein Countergambit – B29 – 1.e4 c5 2.Nf3 Nf6 3.e5 Nd5 4.Nc3 e6 5.Nxd5 exd5 6.d4 Nc6
 Portsmouth Gambit – B30 – 1.e4 c5 2.Nf3 Nc6 3.b4
 Morra Gambit – B32 – 1.e4 c5 2.Nf3 Nc6 3.d4 cxd4 4.c3
 Kasparov Gambit – B44 – 1.e4 c5 2.Nf3 e6 3.d4 cxd4 4.Nxd4 Nc6 5.Nb5 d6 6.c4 Nf6 7.N1c3 a6 8.Na3 d5
 Sicilian Gambit – B45 – 1.e4 c5 2.Nf3 e6 3.d4 cxd4 4.Nxd4 Nf6 5.Nc3 Nc6 6.Be2 Bb4 7.0-0
 Wing Gambit Deferred [Sicilian 2...d6] – B50 – 1.e4 c5 2.Nf3 d6 (or 2...e6) 3.b4
 Bronstein Gambit – B52 – 1.e4 c5 2.Nf3 d6 3.Bb5+ Bd7 4.Bxd7+ Qxd7 5.0-0 Nc6 6.c3 Nf6 7.d4
 Ginsburg Gambit – B57 – 1.e4 c5 2.Nf3 d6 3.d4 cxd4 4.Nxd4 Nf6 5.Bc4
 Zollner Gambit – B73 – 1.e4 c5 2.Nf3 d6 3.d4 cxd4 4.Nxd4 Nf6 5.Nc3 g6 6.Be2 Bg7 7.Be3 Nc6 8.0-0 0-0 9.f4 Qb6 10.e5
 Poisoned Pawn – B79 – 1.e4 c5 2.Nf3 d6 3.d4 cxd4 4.Nxd4 Nf6 5.Nc3 a6 6.Bg5 e6 7.f4 Qb6 8.Qd2 Qxb2

Slav Defense
 Winawer Countergambit – B10 – 1.d4 d5 2.c4 c6 3.Nc3 e5
 Diemer Gambit – B12 – 1.d4 d5 2.c4 c6 3.e4
 Slav Gambit – B15 – 1.d4 d5 2.c4 c6 3.Nf3 Nf6 4.Nc3 dxc4 5.e4
 Tolush–Geller Gambit – B15 – 1.d4 d5 2.c4 c6 3.Nf3 Nf6 4.Nc3 dxc4 5.e4 b5 6.e5

Sodium Attack
 Durkin Gambit – A00 – 1.Na3 e5 2.Nc4 Nc6 3.e4 f5

Sokolsky Opening
 Birmingham Gambit – A00 – 1.b4 c5
 Queen’s Knight’s Gambit – A00 – 1.b4 b5 2.a4
 Tartakower (Fischer) Gambit – A00 – 1.b4 e5 2.Bb2 f6 3.e4

Tarrasch Defense
 Marshall Gambit – D32 – 1.d4 d5 2.c4 e6 3.Nc3 c5 4.cxd5 exd5 5.e4
 Tarrasch Gambit – D32 – 1.d4 d5 2.c4 e6 3.Nc3 c5 4.cxd5 exd5 5.dxc5 d4 6.Na4 b5
 Von Hennig–Schara Gambit (Hennig–Schara Gambit, Schara–Hennig Countergambit) – D32 – 1.d4 d5 2.c4 e6 3.Nc3 c5 4.cxd5 cxd4

Torre Attack
 Wagner Gambit – A46 – 1.d4 Nf6 2.Nf3 e6 3.Bg5 c5 4.e4

Two Knights Defence
 Boden–Kieseritzky Gambit – C55 – 1.e4 e5 2.Nf3 Nc6 3.Bc4 Nf6 4.Nc3 Nxe4 5.0-0
 Fegatello/Fried Liver Attack – C57 – 1.e4 e5 2.Nf3 Nc6 3.Bc4 Nf6 4.Ng5 d5 5.exd5 Nxd5 6.Nxf7 Kxf7
 Ponziani-Steinitz Gambit – C57 – 1.e4 e5 2.Nf3 Nc6 3.Bc4 Nf6 4.Ng5 Nxe4
 Wilkes-Barre/Traxler Variation – C57 – 1.e4 e5 2.Nf3 Nc6 3.Bc4 Nf6 4.Ng5 Bc5
 Ulvestad Variation – C57 – 1.e4 e5 2.Nf3 Nc6 3.Bc4 Nf6 4.Ng5 d5 5.exd5 b5
 Two Knights' Gambit – C58 – 1.e4 e5 2.Nf3 Nc6 3.Bc4 Nf6 4.Ng5 d5 5.exd5 Na5

Vienna Game
 Max Lange, Meitner-Mieses Gambit – C23 – 1.e4 e5 2.Nc3 Nc6 3.Bc4 Bc5 4.Qg4 Qf6 5.Nd5
 Fyfe Gambit – C25 – 1.e4 e5 2.Nc3 Nc6 3.d4
 Hamppe–Allgaier Gambit – C25 – 1.e4 e5 2.Nc3 Nc6 3.f4 exf4 4.Nf3 g5 5.h4 g4 6.Ng5
 Hamppe–Muzio Gambit – C25 – 1.e4 e5 2.Nc3 Nc6 3.f4 exf4 4.Nf3 g5 5.Bc4 g4 6.0-0
 Pierce Gambit – C25 – 1.e4 e5 2.Nc3 Nc6 3.f4 exf4 4.Nf3 g5 5.d4 g4 6.Bc4
 Steinitz Gambit – C25 – 1.e4 e5 2.Nc3 Nc6 3.f4 exf4 4.d4
 Adams Gambit – C27 – 1.e4 e5 2.Nc3 Nf6 3.Bc4 Nxe4 4.Qh5 Nd6 5.Bb3 Nc6 6.d4
 Frankenstein–Dracula Variation – C27 – 1.e4 e5 2.Nc3 Nf6 3.Bc4 Nxe4 4.Qh5 Nd6 5.Bb3 Nc6 6.Nb5 g6 7.Qf3 f5 8.Qd5 Qe7 9.Nxc7+ Kd8 10.Nxa8 b6
 Vienna Gambit – C29 – 1.e4 e5 2.Nc3 Nf6 3.f4
 Quelle Gambit – C25 – 1.e4 e5 2.Nc3 Nc6 3.f4 Bc5 4.fxe5 d6

Ware Opening
 Ware Gambit – A00 – 1.a4 e5 2.a5 d5 3.e3 f5 4.a6

References

External links
Indice dei gambetti in ordine alfabetico per nome 

+
Gambits